Tomáš Dráb (born 1 June 1999) is a Slovak professional footballer who currently plays for Slavoj Trebišov as a goalkeeper.

Club career

MFK Zemplín Michalovce
Dráb made his Fortuna Liga debut for Zemplín Michalovce against Ružomberok on 21 June 2020. He was featured for the entirety of the match.

References

External links
 MFK Zemplín Michalovce official club website 
 
 
 Futbalnet profile 

1999 births
Living people
People from Michalovce
Sportspeople from the Košice Region
Slovak footballers
Association football goalkeepers
MFK Zemplín Michalovce players
FK Slavoj Trebišov players
Slovak Super Liga players
2. Liga (Slovakia) players